The RPK (English: "Kalashnikov hand-held machine gun"), sometimes retroactively termed the RPK-47, is a Soviet 7.62×39mm light machine gun that was developed by Mikhail Kalashnikov in the early 1960s, in parallel with the AKM assault rifle. It was created to standardize the small arms inventory of the Soviet Army, where it replaced the 7.62×39mm RPD machine gun. The RPK continues to be used by the military of the post-Soviet states and certain African and Asian nations. The RPK is also manufactured in Bulgaria, Romania and Serbia.

Design details

Operating mechanism
The RPK functions identically to the AK-47. It also uses the same 7.62×39mm ammunition. It has a similar design layout to the Kalashnikov series of rifles, with modifications to increase the RPK's effective range and accuracy, enhance its sustained fire capability, and strengthen the receiver.

Features
The RPK features a thicker and longer barrel than the AKM. This allows for it to be fired for longer without permanent loss in accuracy due to the barrel heating up. The chrome-lined barrel is permanently fixed to the receiver and cannot be replaced in the field. It is fitted with a new front sight base, and the gas block lacks both a bayonet lug and an under-barrel cleaning rod guide. The barrel also features a folding bipod mounted near the muzzle, and a front sight base with a lug that limits the bipod's rotation around the axis of the barrel. The barrel has a threaded muzzle, enabling the use of muzzle devices such as flash hiders, compensators, and blank-firing adapters. When a muzzle device is not being used, the threads on the muzzle can be covered by a thread protector. The barrel is pinned to the receiver in a modified trunnion, reinforced by ribbing, and is slightly wider than the trunnion used on the standard AKM type rifles. Symmetrical bulges on both sides of the front trunnion ensure a proper fit inside the receiver.

The RPK also has a slightly longer receiver, by about 20 mm or less. This was done to decrease the fire rate slightly, but not significantly enough to lower it any less than 600 rounds per minute. The U-shaped receiver is stamped from a smooth  sheet of steel compared to the  sheet metal receiver used on the standard AKM rifles. It uses a modified AKM recoil spring assembly that consists of a rear spring guide rod from the AK and a new forward flat guide rod and coil spring. It features a thick laminated wood foregrip and a fixed laminated wood "club-foot" buttstock similar to the stock used on the RPD, which is designed to allow the user to fire from the prone position more comfortably. It uses a standard AKM pistol grip and can also use standard AKM detachable box magazines, but it is most commonly used with a 40-round box magazine or a 75-round drum magazine. Interchangeability of parts between the RPK and AKM are moderate.

Sights
The weapon's rear sight leaf is elevation adjustable, and graduated for ranges of 100 to 1,000 meters in 100 m increments. The rear sight leaf also features a windage adjustment knob unique to the RPK series of rifles.

Accessories
Supplied with the RPK are: spare magazines, a cleaning rod, cleaning kit (stored in a hollowed compartment in the buttstock), a sling, oil bottle, and magazine pouches (a single-pocket pouch for a drum magazine or a 4-pocket pouch for box magazines).

Variants

RPK 

The RPK is the standard light machine gun/squad automatic model and is chambered in 7.62×39mm. It was adopted by the former Soviet Union and was issued mainly to motorized units. It was later adopted by several military agencies around the world.

RPKS
The RPKS ("S" — Skladnoy (Russian: складной) means "folding" [stock]) is a variant of the RPK with a side-folding wooden stock was intended primarily for the paratroopers. Changes to the design of the RPKS are limited only to the shoulder stock mounting, at the rear of the receiver. It uses a trunnion riveted to both receiver walls that has a socket and tang, allowing the stock to hinge on a pivot pin. The trunnion has a cut-out on the right side which is designed to engage the stock catch and lock it in place when folded. The wooden stock is mounted in a pivoting hull, which contains a catch that secures the buttstock in the extended position. The rear sling loop was moved from the left side of the stock body to the right side of the stock frame.

RPK-74

The RPK-74 (РПК-74) was introduced in 1974 together with the AK-74 assault rifle and chambered for the new 5.45×39mm intermediate cartridge. It was derived from the AK-74 rifle, with modifications that mirror those made to the AKM to create the RPK.

The RPK-74 also uses a longer and heavier chrome-plated barrel, which has a new gas block with a gas channel at a 90° angle to the bore axis, and a ring for the cleaning rod. It is also equipped with a folding bipod and a different front sight tower. The muzzle is threaded for a flash suppressor or blank-firing device.

The rear stock trunnion was strengthened and the magazine well was reinforced with steel inserts.

Additionally, the RPK-74 has a modified return mechanism compared to the AK-74, which uses a new type of metal spring guide rod and recoil spring. The rear sight assembly, forward handguard and receiver dust cover were all retained from the RPK.

The RPK-74 feeds from a 45-round steel or polymer box magazine, interchangeable with magazines from the AK-74, and is designed to be charged from stripper clips. Drum magazines similar to those used on the previous RPK models were tested during its development phase, but were discontinued in favor of the 45-round box magazine. However, recently the production of a 97-round drum has started. This drum was designed to be used with the AK-107 but can also be used in any 5.45×39mm weapon with compatible magazines, such as the RPK-74 and RPK-74M. They were also testing with experimental conventional drums, a prototype 100-round belt fed drum magazine was also created. It attaches into the regular magazine well, but the cartridges are stored on a 100-round belt inside a box. A feed system removes them from the belt and puts them in a position where they can be loaded through the regular magazine well. This system is actuated by a lever from the magazine that clips around the charging handle. It is unknown if this ever went into service.

Standard equipment includes: eight magazines, six stripper clips (15 rounds per clip), a speedloader guide, cleaning rod, cleaning kit, sling, oil bottle and two magazine pouches. Some variants do not come with the cleaning kit option.

It is in widespread use by member states of the former Soviet Union, as well as Bulgaria.

RPKS-74
The RPKS-74 is the paratrooper variant of the RPK-74, equipped with a wooden folding stock from the RPKS.

RPK-74M

The RPK-74M (Modernizirovannij "Modernized") is an updated variant of the RPK-74 developed during the mid-'70s. In line with the AK-74M assault rifle variant, the RPK-74M lower handguard, gas tube cover, pistol grip, and new synthetic stock are made from a black, glass-filled polyamide. The stock is shaped like the RPK-74 fixed stock, but also side-folds like the RPKS-74. The stock additionally has an easier to use release mechanism, replacing the bullet press release from the RPKS and RPKS-74. Each RPK-74M is fitted standard with a side-rail bracket for mounting optics. It also includes most of the 74M economic changes, such as the dimpled on barrel hardware, omission of lightening cuts from the front sight block and piston and stamped gas tube release lever. Updated magazines were produced by Molot with horizontal ribs going up the sides of the magazines. An export variant chambered in 5.56×45mm NATO was also introduced, designated as the RPK-201. Also for export is the RPKM (A.K.A. RPK-203) chambered in 7.62×39mm; it uses the same polymer furniture as the RPK-74M variant.

Night versions
The RPK family of light machine guns are also available in a night fighting configuration. These weapons are designated as the RPKN, RPKSN, RPK-74N, and RPKS-74N. They have a side rail mounting on the left side of the receiver that accepts a NSP-3, NSPU, or NSPUM night vision sight. Models designated RPKN-1, RPKSN-1, RPK-74N and RPKS-74N can mount the multi-model night vision scope NSPU-3 (1PN51) while RPKN2, RPKSN2, RPK-74N2 and RPKS-74N2 can mount the multi-model night vision scope NSPUM (1PN58).

Derivatives

RPK-16

The RPK-16 squad automatic weapon (the number 16 indicates the year 2016, when the development first started) is Kalashnikov's response to the "Tokar-2" program, where it competed against Degtyaryov's submission. In 2018, the Ministry of Defence of the Russian Federation have signed a contract concerning the procurement of the RPK-16, and is expected to take over the role of the RPK-74 in the Russian Armed Forces.

The RPK-16 is chambered in 5.45×39mm which features the traditional Kalashnikov gas-operated long-stroke piston system, and shares several novel technical and ergonomic features derived from the AK-12 program. Its design enables it to have an interchangeable barrels that can easily be removed, and the ability to quickly attach a detachable suppressor. It primarily uses a 95-round drum magazine and is backwards compatible with box magazines from the AK-74, AK-12 and RPK-74.

After receiving feedback on the performance of the weapon, the Kalashnikov Concern has begun development on the RPL-20 (20 indicating 2020) belt-fed light machine gun also chambered in 5.45×39mm and with a very similar rate of fire. Kalashnikov Concern has so far created at least one functional prototype. If adopted, the gun will become the first light machine gun to be used by Russian forces since the RPD that isn't magazine-fed or of the standard Kalashnikov pattern.

Molot Vepr

A series of semi-automatic rifles and shotguns based on the heavy RPK receiver are manufactured by the Molot factory in Vyatskiye Polyany, Russia. These rifles are known as the Vepr (Vepr > "Wild Boar"). They are offered in several chamberings, including: .223 Remington, 7.62×39mm, 5.45×39mm, 6.5mm Grendel, 7.62×54mmR, .308 Winchester, .30-06 Springfield and Vepr shotguns in 12 gauge, 20 gauge, and .410 bore.
The hallmark of Vepr rifles is their heavy RPK receiver and barrel. The barrel, gas block, and bore are chrome lined throughout.
They are intended for the civilian market, and are marketed as high quality hunting rifles. Due to this designation, they lack features seen on most AK type rifles. Vepr rifles do not include a bayonet lug, integrated cleaning rods or tool kits, can not accept standard AK magazines, and have wooden thumb-hole stocks. Some buy these rifles to "convert" into a traditional style AK rifle, installing new pistol-grip stocks and adding tactical accessories.

Early generations of the Vepr rifle were manufactured with slant-back receivers, making them incompatible with most AK furniture sets without a converter. The receivers were changed to straight-back in the second generation. Subsequent versions of the rifle reverted to slant-back.
Due to this rapid change between designs, it is not uncommon to find some second generation Vepr rifles with rough, incomplete stocks that have not been sanded or painted.

Users

 
 : Uses both Soviet and locally produced ASh-78 Tip-2 rifles.
 : RPK-47
 : Produced by Arsenal as the LMG in three different calibers, 7.62×39mm, 5.45×39mm and 5.56×45mm NATO. Uniquely had milled receivers. A folding stock variant is known as the LMG-F.
 
 
 
 
 
 
 
 
 
 
 
 : RPK-201 variant.
 : RPK-74 variant is still in use by the Georgian Army and special forces.
 
 
 : Locally known as "BB-Kalash".
  Also manufactured locally as Al Quds
 : RPK-74
 
 
 : RPK-74 variant is used by the Grup Gerak Khas (GGK) of the Malaysian Army.
 : Armed and Security Forces of Mali.
 
 
 
 
 
 : Type 64.
 
 : Built by Fabrica de Arme Cugir SA as the Puşcă Mitralieră model 1964 ("model 1964 light machine gun") and later, a 5.45mm version based on the PA md. 86—the Mitralieră md. 1993 ("model 1993 light machine gun").
 : RPK-74, RPK-74M and RPK-16
 
 : Manufactured locally as the Zastava M72.
 
 
 
 
  Transnistria
 
 Lord's Resistance Army
 : RPK-74 and RPK, also used by separatists
: Used during the Iraq War

Former users
 : Manufactured locally as the LMGK (Leichtes Maschinengewehr Kalashnikov)
 
 : Manufactured locally as the Zastava M72.

See also
 PK machine gun
 PKP Pecheneg machine gun
 M249 light machine gun
 IWI Negev
 QJY-88
 FN Minimi
 ČZW-762
 Nikonov machine gun
 IP-2
 Valmet M78
 Zastava M77
 RPL-20

References

 Rottman, Gordon. (2011) The AK-47: Kalashnikov-series Assault Rifles. Osprey Publishing

External links

 Юрий Пономарёв "Битва трёх «К»", Kalashnikov magazine, 2010/6, pp. 76–85 (in Russian, covers the design competition)
 Manual-Kalashnikov-1973 Soviet RPK Manual Covering Operation and Repair
 EnemyForces.com
Modern Firearms – RPK
Modern Firearms – RPK-74
 Kalashnikov.guns.ru
 Technical data, instructional images and diagrams of the RPK-47M 
  

5.45×39mm machine guns
7.62×39mm machine guns
Cold War firearms of the Soviet Union
Light machine guns
Infantry weapons of the Cold War
Kalashnikov derivatives
Long stroke piston firearms
Machine guns of the Soviet Union
Kalashnikov Concern products
Squad automatic weapons
Vyatskiye Polyany Machine-Building Plant products
Weapons and ammunition introduced in 1961